Peculiar Attraction is a 1988  Argentine film directed by Enrique Carreras. Starring Alberto Olmedo and Jorge Porcel.

Cast
Alberto Olmedo ....  Alberto
Jorge Porcel ....  Jorge
Pablo Codevila
Judith Gabbani
Adolfo García Grau
Rodolfo Machado
Adrián Martel
Edgardo Mesa
Fernando Olmedo
Silvia Pérez
Ignacio Quirós
Ana María Ricci
Beatriz Salomón
Sergio Velazco Ferrero
Tincho Zabala

External links

1988 films
Argentine romantic comedy films
1980s Spanish-language films
Films shot in Mar del Plata
1980s Argentine films
Films directed by Enrique Carreras